The PalaPanini (officially ) is an indoor sporting arena located in Modena, Italy. It was open in 1985 and has mainly served as the home venue for volleyball clubs based in and around Modena, with other sporting events (basketball, futsal, table tennis, fencing, judo, martial arts) taking place occasionally. The venue can also accommodate conventions, theatre and music concerts.

The sporting complex includes the main play area (52m x 35m) for basketball, volleyball or table tennis, which can be divided into 3 pavilions. The facilities also contain dressing rooms, infirmary, gyms, special rooms (for martial arts and fencing), warehouses, sports medicine ambulatory service, offices, meeting rooms, press room, toilets, bar and ticket office. The capacity is of 4,968 spectators for sporting events.

References

Indoor arenas in Italy
Volleyball venues in Italy
Buildings and structures in Modena
Sports venues in Emilia-Romagna